Port of Trisakti (Indonesian: Pelabuhan Trisakti) is the busiest and biggest Indonesian seaport in Kalimantan. It is located at Banjarmasin, South Kalimantan between the rivers Martapura and Barito on the delta island of Tapas on the south coast of Borneo.

References 

Buildings and structures in Banjarmasin
Water transport in Indonesia